Solanum peruvianum (syn. Lycopersicon peruvianum) is a species of wild tomato in the family Solanaceae. It is native to the Galápagos Islands, Ecuador, Peru, and northern Chile, and has been introduced to California. Some authorities consider it to be a member (and namesake) of a species complex, with the other members being Solanum corneliomuelleri, Solanum huaylasense, and Solanum arcanum.

References

peruvianum
Flora of the Galápagos Islands
Flora of Ecuador
Flora of Peru
Flora of northern Chile
Plants described in 1753
Taxa named by Carl Linnaeus